Initial Success is the third studio album by Scottish musician BA Robertson, released on 7 March 1980 by Asylum Records. The album peaked at number 32 on the UK Albums Chart and several singles were released, including the top 10 hits "Bang Bang", "Knocked It Off" and "To Be or Not to Be". The album was reissued on CD on 12 May 2017 by Cherry Red Records and includes several of the singles' B-sides as well as songs performed live at the 2004 Edinburgh Fringe Festival.

Background 
Born in Glasgow, Brian Alexander Robertson began his musical career in 1973 with the release of his debut album Wringing Applause, a concept album recorded with Terry Manning and released on Ardent Records. Having found a new key collaborator in session bass player Herbie Flowers, Robertson released Shadow of a Thin Man in 1976 on Arista Records. Neither album found any success, and Robertson felt out of place amidst the progressive rock movement. Robertson soon found himself attuned with the burgeoning new wave movement, having heard "So It Goes" by Nick Lowe on the radio; Robertson has recalled "I thought - hey hang on a second I understand this more than ELP or dare I say Genesis or Yes. It sounded more like Ready Steady Go! to me, or Thank Your Lucky Stars. Robertson sent a four song demo tape to Warner Communications, and on the strength of "Goosebumps" was sent to Regent Sound, Denmark Street to record a professional demo. This led to a signing with Asylum Records.

Release and reception 

Initial Success was released on 7 March 1980, following the success of the singles "Bang Bang", "Knocked It Off" and "Kool in the Kaftan". Robertson-Britten composition "Carrie" was a number 4 hit for Cliff Richard on 1 March 1980, a week prior the album's release. Robertson embarked on a 20-date UK tour in support of the album during April and May 1980.

Writing in Record Mirror, Robin Smith described Robertson as "trying too hard", commenting "experiencing Robertson fully unleashed is like being strapped into a chair where you're forced to watch 100 repeats of The Benny Hill Show". Smith considered "Eat Your Heart Out Sandy Nelson" the album's weakest track, and described "The B Side" as "a boring rock 'n' roll piss take that's been flogged time and time before". Though he praised "Knocked It Off" and "Man or a Mouse?", Smith declared "sorry chums, but I don't think the three minute hero can cut it for an entire album".

Reviewing the album's 2017 reissue, Record Collector's Mark Elliott commented "Bordering the novelty but BA’s offbeat lyrics don’t diminish a melodic flair". Ian Canty  of Louder Than War considered Robertson's "in your face" nature to be detrimental to the songs, commenting "he’s always there, filling in any gaps with stupid voices and jokes, like a very nervous first dater scared of leaving a silence... ...though Robertson can without doubt come up with a good tune, he couldn’t leave it alone for any length of time". Canty concluded "Initial Success is really a well-produced, inventive record, but a bit faddy and flaunts its cleverness just a bit too much for me".

Track listing 

2017 bonus tracks:

Personnel 
Musicians

 BA Robertson – lead vocals, backing vocals, additional keyboards
 Terry Britten – backing vocals, guitar, sitar (track 5)
 Alan Jones – bass guitar
 John Giblin – additional bass guitar
 Graham Jarvis – drums
 Stuart Elliott – additional drums
 Billy Livsey – keyboards
 Adrian Lee, Mike McNaught – additional keyboards
 Barry Morgan, Chris Karan, Jim Lawless, Lennie Clarke, Louis Jordan, Pete Baron, Tony Carr – percussion
 Neil Sorrell – sarangi (track 13)

Technical

 John Hudson – engineer
 Richard Savage – art direction
 Bob Searles – illustration
 Niall Doull-Connolly, Adrian Boot – photography
 Recorded at Mayfair Studios, London and mastered at Utopia Studios, London

Charts

References 

1980 albums
BA Robertson albums
Asylum Records albums